The 2005 Ruichang earthquake occurred at  on 26 November in Ruichang, Jiangxi, China. The United States Geological Survey reported the event's moment magnitude as 5.2. At least fourteen people died, including five in Ruichang, seven in neighboring Jiujiang, and two across the river in Wuxue, Hubei.  At least 370 people were injured, including twenty seriously so. Hundreds of buildings were destroyed and thousands damaged.  Residents temporarily fled homes, businesses, and even hospitals for fear of aftershocks.  Local temperatures were mild at the time, around 10 °C. Shockwaves were felt as far away as Shangrao, Changsha, and Wuhan.

See also
List of earthquakes in 2005
List of earthquakes in China

External links
Half a million flee homes after Chinese earthquake – The Guardian
Earthquake strikes central China  – BBC News
Earthquake claims 14 lives in east China – The Hindu

2005 Ruichang
Ruichang
Ruichang
History of Jiangxi